Gołocin may refer to the following places in Poland:
Gołocin, Lower Silesian Voivodeship (south-west Poland)
Gołocin, Masovian Voivodeship (east-central Poland)